William Forrest (28 February 1908 – February 1965) was manager of the English football club Darlington from 1946 to 1950. Between 1929 and 1945 he played 307 League matches for Middlesbrough FC.

Managerial statistics

External links

English footballers
Middlesbrough F.C. players
Darlington F.C. managers
1965 deaths
1908 births
People from Tranent
Association footballers not categorized by position
English football managers